In statistics, deviance is a goodness-of-fit statistic for a statistical model; it is often used for statistical hypothesis testing. It is a generalization of the idea of using the sum of squares of residuals (SSR) in ordinary least squares to cases where model-fitting is achieved by maximum likelihood. It plays an important role in exponential dispersion models and generalized linear models.

Definition
The unit deviance  is a bivariate function that satisfies the following conditions:
 
 
The total deviance  of a model with predictions  of the observation  is the sum of its unit deviances: .

The (total) deviance for a model M0 with estimates , based on a dataset y, may be constructed by its likelihood as:

Here  denotes the fitted values of the parameters in the model M0, while  denotes the fitted parameters for the saturated model: both sets of fitted values are implicitly functions of the observations y. Here, the saturated model is a model with a parameter for every observation so that the data are fitted exactly. This expression is simply 2 times the log-likelihood ratio of the full model compared to the reduced model. The deviance is used to compare two models – in particular in the case of generalized linear models (GLM) where it has a similar role to residual sum of squares from ANOVA in linear models (RSS).

Suppose in the framework of the GLM, we have two nested models, M1 and M2. In particular, suppose that M1 contains the parameters in M2, and k additional parameters. Then, under the null hypothesis that M2 is the true model, the difference between the deviances for the two models follows, based on Wilks' theorem, an approximate chi-squared distribution with k-degrees of freedom. This can be used for hypothesis testing on the deviance.

Some usage of the term "deviance" can be confusing.  According to Collett:
 "the quantity  is sometimes referred to as a deviance.  This is [...] inappropriate, since unlike the deviance used in the context of generalized linear modelling,  does not measure deviation from a model that is a perfect fit to the data." 

However, since the principal use is in the form of the difference of the deviances of two models, this confusion in definition is unimportant.

Examples

See also
Akaike information criterion
Deviance information criterion
Hosmer–Lemeshow test, a quality of fit statistic that can be used for binary data
Pearson's chi-squared test, an alternative quality of fit statistic for generalized linear models for count data
Peirce's criterion

Notes

References

External links
Generalized Linear Models - Edward F. Connor
Lectures notes on Deviance 

Statistical hypothesis testing
Statistical deviation and dispersion